QSI International School of Dushanbe is a branch of the non-profit organization Quality School International and is located in Dushanbe, Tajikistan. QSI International School of Dushanbe was founded in 2004 as a private institution and currently has approximately 150 students. QSI International School of Dushanbe teaches students from preschool (age 3) to secondary school (age 18) with a curriculum entirely in English. In addition to English, there are also other foreign-language classes offered in Russian (native and non-native), German, and French.

Facilities 

QSI Dushanbe was first established in 2004 at 2 Osipenko Street. The school changed its location on March, 2010 since the student population grew to 39 students and the facility no longer provided the necessary space for the development of the school. The school relocated to 85 Sovetskaya Street in 2016. In the summer of 2022, the school relocated to a purpose-built facility at 3 Turakul Zehni Street.  Housed in two 4-story buildings, the new facility offers 30 standard classrooms plus an Art room, a Music room, a chemistry/biology lab, a small theater, a gym, and a cafeteria that seats over 100.  The building capacity is estimated at 350 students, allowing plenty of room for future growth in enrollment.

Information Resources and Technology 

In 2022, students at QSID in early elementary classes are provided iPads to use in class, with older elementary students having access to two stationary computer labs equipped with desktops plus a rolling laptop lab.  The middle school use one-to-one laptops provided by the school, while students in secondary are required to have a personal device.  There is also a secondary computer lab equipped with desktops and a limited number of desktops available in secondary classrooms for student use.  The school currently employs one full-time and one part-time technology teacher, a full time IT Coordinator, and a part-time IT support person.  

QSI Dushanbe was established in 2004. During the years of 2004-2008, 0 computers were purchased. In the fall of 2008, the computer lab was small and could only fit 6 computers. The computer lab had hard wire internet capability only (no Wifi). In the fall of 2009, the school acquired the new building and the computer lab was set up in the library as part of an information resource center. In the fall of 2010, Destiny was purchased and the school signed an online subscription. GRASP and funds from the school's budget were used to authorize legal software and to purchase 14 updated computers.

In the school year of 2010-2011, the school hired a part-time technology teacher and support. A new internet package with bigger traffic and faster speed was obtained. In April 2011, all computers were networked and a black & white and a colored printer were also purchased in this year. In 2010, the school began its implementation of a new QSI technology curriculum. In the summer, the school purchased a digital camera and a projector. In the winter of 2011, five more computers were purchased. In the fall 2012, a teacher workstation (room) was created. In December 2012, Destiny was updated by a specialist. In January 2013, the school purchased a server for Destiny and data transfer. The internet traffic and the internet speed was increased.
The QSI Dushanbe is continuously upgrading their technological resources around the school. Over the last few years, QSI Dushanbe has done a lot to improve the school's technology system to ensure that the students have all the technological resources to succeed.

Educational Program 

The Elementary program of QSI Dushanbe consists of grades 1-8 and the curriculum is based on the American education system. The subjects that are taught include: Mathematics, Literature, Writing, Cultural Studies, Music, Art, Physical Education, Science, Technology, Study Skills, Russian, French, and German.

QSI Dushanbe offers a secondary program that leads to a Secondary School Diploma. The three diplomas that are offered by QSI Dushanbe are the general diploma, the academic diploma, and the academic diploma with honors. The academic diploma requires a total of 240 credits, while the academic diploma with honors requires at least two Advanced Placement (AP) classes on top of 240 credits. The general diploma requires a total of 220 credits and is available to students experiencing English language difficulties, time restraints, or other challenges that make it impractical to pursue an academic diploma. The general diploma is only available to students who are in their fourth year of secondary studies or who will turn 18 years old no later than 30 October following their graduation.

References

Schools in Tajikistan
Dushanbe
Educational institutions established in 2004
2004 establishments in Tajikistan